The Highlands Water Protection and Planning Act is a 2004 New Jersey law aimed at protecting the Highlands region of northwest New Jersey by regulating development within the region under the supervision of the New Jersey Highlands Water Protection and Planning Council (NJ Highlands Council), under the New Jersey Department of Environmental Protection. The area is primarily in Warren, Morris, Hunterdon, Passaic, and Sussex counties, while also reaching into parts of Bergen and Somerset counties.. The act is intended to preserve both large volumes of New Jersey's fresh water sources for 5.4 million residents and the biodiversity in the area, in the face of increasing development in the exurbs of New York City. The act was signed into law on August 10, 2004, by Governor of New Jersey James McGreevey.

The provisions of the Act are monitored and controlled by the Highlands Water Protection and Planning Council. The Council has 15 members, with a minimum of eight officials named from the Highlands Region, at least five of whom are municipal officials and three of whom must be county officials.

Legal challenges to the Highlands Act have been filed, including at least one in federal court in Trenton.  In that case, the Phillipsburg Alliance Church of Phillipsburg, Warren County, sued the Commissioner of the New Jersey Department of Environmental Protection seeking to enjoin her and NJDEP from denying the church an exemption under the Highlands Act which would permit it to build its proposed new church sanctuary on a  parcel in neighboring Lopatcong, New Jersey.  The property lies on the boundary of the Highland's Act's Preservation and Planning Areas.

Municipalities
The following municipalities are in the region regulated by the act:

References

External links
Highlands Water Protection and Planning Act
New Jersey Highlands Council
Text of the Highlands Water Protection and Planning Act: Assembly Committee Substitute for Assembly, No. 2635
New Jersey Highlands Planning and Preservation Boundaries (map, PDF)
New Jersey Highlands Coalition

Bergen County, New Jersey
Hunterdon County, New Jersey
Morris County, New Jersey
Passaic County, New Jersey
Somerset County, New Jersey
Sussex County, New Jersey
Warren County, New Jersey
New Jersey statutes
2004 in the environment
2004 in American law
2004 in New Jersey
United States state environmental legislation